The NHL Entry Draft, originally known as the NHL Amateur Draft, is a collective meeting in which the franchises of the National Hockey League (NHL) systematically select the exclusive rights to available amateur players who meet the eligibility requirements to play professional hockey in the NHL. First held in 1963, the draft prior to 1969 was a shorter affair. Any amateur player who was aged 17 years and older and was not already sponsored by an NHL club was eligible to be drafted. In 1969 the rules were changed so that any amateur player between the ages of 17 and 20 was eligible to be drafted. The draft has grown, and in 2021, 223 players were selected over seven rounds.

A total of 60 different players have been selected first. Of those, 43 have been Canadian, eight American, three Russian, two Czech, two Swedish, one Slovak and one Swiss. Every first overall pick taken between 1968 and 2016 has played in at least 299 NHL games. Three players retired without having played an NHL game.

The Montreal Canadiens have had the most first overall picks of any other team, selecting six players first between 1963 and 2022. Anaheim Ducks, Calgary Flames, Carolina Hurricanes, Minnesota Wild, Nashville Predators, San Jose Sharks, Seattle Kraken, Vancouver Canucks and Vegas Golden Knights have never drafted a first overall pick. Five players have come from the London Knights of the Ontario Hockey League, more than any other team. Eleven players have won the Calder Memorial Trophy as the NHL's rookie of the year: Gilbert Perreault, Denis Potvin, Bobby Smith, Dale Hawerchuk, Mario Lemieux, Bryan Berard, Alexander Ovechkin, Patrick Kane, Nathan MacKinnon, Aaron Ekblad and Auston Matthews. Eight have been inducted into the Hockey Hall of Fame: Perreault, Potvin, Guy Lafleur, Eric Lindros, Hawerchuk, Lemieux, Mats Sundin and Mike Modano.

First overall picks 

Key

Notes
 Wendel Clark was drafted as a defenceman

See also 
 WHA Amateur Draft

References 
General

 
 
 
 
 
 

Specific